Tyger is the thirtieth major release and seventeenth studio album by Tangerine Dream. It is based on the poetry of William Blake. Three of the tracks have lyrics taken from the poems The Tyger, London and Smile. The track London also incorporates lines from A Little Girl Lost, America: a Prophecy and The Fly.

This was the final studio album to feature long-time member Christopher Franke.

"Tyger" spent one week on the UK Albums Chart at No.88. This is Tangerine Dream's last UK chart appearance to date.

Track listing
1987 release

1992 release

Personnel
 Edgar Froese
 Christopher Franke
 Paul Haslinger
 Jocelyn B. Smith – vocals on "Tyger", "London" and "Smile"

References

1987 albums
1992 albums
Tangerine Dream albums
Jive Records albums